Coccidiphila violenta is a moth in the family Cosmopterigidae. It was described by Edward Meyrick in 1916. It is found in Guyana.

The forewings are very narrowly lanceolate of deep ochreous coloration with some blackish irrorations (sprinkles) suffused with grey.

References

Moths described in 1916
Cosmopteriginae